Robert Buddy Lazier (born October 31, 1967) is an American auto racing driver, best known for winning the 1996 Indianapolis 500 and the 2000 Indy Racing League season championship.

Lazier began his career in the 1980s by competing in such series as the IMSA GT Championship, the SCCA Canadian-American Challenge Cup and the American Indycar Series. Lazier won the American Indycar Series championship in 1988. Lazier started his IndyCar career in 1989 by competing in the Indy Car World Series. During the season, Lazier failed to qualify for the Indianapolis 500. Lazier eventually qualified for the Indianapolis 500 in 1991. During his Champ Car career, Lazier often drove for teams that used older chassis and engines; his best finish in the Champ Car standings was a 19th-place finish in 1992.

Lazier began to compete in the newly formed Indy Racing League in 1996. Lazier won the Indianapolis 500 that season, and he became one of the most dominant drivers in the series for a period of time, winning eight races overall and the series championship in 2000. Lazier began to drive only at the Indianapolis 500 in 2007 and continued to enter the Indianapolis 500 through 2009. He did not return to the series until 2013 at the Indianapolis 500 when he competed for Lazier Partners Racing, a team started by his father Bob Lazier and various investors. Lazier and the team repeated their efforts in 2014, 2015, 2016 and, for the final time, in 2017.

Career
Lazier was born in Vail, Colorado.

Canadian-American Challenge Cup
For 1986, Lazier competed in the SCCA Canadian-American Challenge Cup, driving the No. 43 car for the Texas American Racing Team, driving a Watson 82. Lazier made his début at the second race of the season at Summit Point Motorsports Park. Lazier failed to start the race and was credited with an 18th-place finish. Lazier also competed at St. Louis International Raceway; he started fifth and finished in twelfth place due to a chassis issue. Lazier finished in 26th place in the final standings with 4 points. In 1987, Lazier remained with the Texas American Racing Team, driving the No. 19 March 85C car. At the season-opening race at Willow Springs International Raceway, Lazier qualified on pole position, led 22 of 48 laps and won the race. Lazier also qualified on pole position at Wisconsin State Fairgrounds Park Speedway, led for 25 laps but ultimately finished in 9th place. Lazier finished in third place at Pueblo Motorsports Park and fourth place at the season-ending race at Phoenix International Raceway. Lazier finished in 4th place in the final championship standings with 62 points.

IMSA GT Championship
In 1989, Lazier competed in the IMSA GT Championship, driving the No. 43 Motorsports Marketing Fabcar CL FEP/002-Porsche with John Higgens, Lorenzo Lamas and Justus Reid in the Lights class. Lazier only drove the car at the season-opening SunBank 24 at Daytona. The car started in 46th place but ultimately retired after 395 laps due to an engine failure. The car was classified 4th place in its class and in 31st place overall. In 1993, Lazier returned to the series to compete, in the Lights class, in the season-opening Rolex 24 at Daytona in the No. 42 Pro-Technik Racing Fabcar FEP/002-Porsche with Anthony Lazzaro, Chris Ivey, Mike Sheehan and Sam Shalala. The car started in 58th place overall and finished in 25th overall, 7th place in its class. Lazier only competed at Daytona, therefore finishing in 23rd place in the final Lights championship standings with 18 points.

American Indycar Series
Lazier began to compete in the American Indycar Series in 1988 after Lazier's car owner and teammate, Bill Tempero, purchased Can-Am. Lazier drove a March 85C for Tempero's Texas American Racing Team. At the season-opening race at Willow Springs International Raceway, Lazier qualified on pole position and won the race. Lazier also won the Illinois Grand Prix at St. Louis International Raceway from pole position, the race at Tioga Motorsports Park and both races at the season-ending Bud Light 100 at Willow Springs. The only race that Lazier did not win was the AMG Eurospeed Grand Prix of Colorado at Mountain View Motorsports Park, where Lazier finished second to Robby Unser. Lazier won the inaugural season championship with 152 points.

For 1989, Lazier returned with the Texas American Racing Team, driving a March 85C. At the season-opening races at I-70 Speedway, Lazier finished second to Unser in the first race and crashed out of the second race after completing 10 laps. At the second pair of races at Memphis Motorsports Park, Lazier qualified on pole position for the second race. Lazier won the second race at Colorado National Speedway. Lazier finished the season by winning the first race at Willow Springs before retiring from the second race due to a motor mount issue. Lazier finished in 7th place in the final standings with 173 points.

CART Indy Car World Series

1989–90
In 1989, Lazier attempted to qualify for his first CART Indy Car World Series race, the Indianapolis 500. Lazier drove the No. 35 Lazier Racing March 87C-Cosworth DFX. Lazier crashed in practice and failed to qualify for the race. Lazier later drove for Gary Trout Motorsports in the No. 23 March 87C-Cosworth DFX at the season-ending Champion Spark Plug 300 at Laguna Seca Raceway. Lazier again failed to qualify for the race. In 1990, Lazier first competed at the Indianapolis 500. Lazier drove for Hemelgarn Racing in the No. 91 Lola T88/00-Buick. Lazier crashed his primary car in practice but was able to provisionally qualify for the race in his back-up car. At the beginning of Bump Day, Lazier was the slowest car in the field. John Paul Jr. bumped Lazier from the field and Lazier ultimately failed to qualify. Lazier drove a partial season for Hemelgarn, moving to the team's No. 71 car. Lazier qualified for his first 500-mile race at the Marlboro 500 at Michigan International Speedway in the No. 24 Penske PC17-Buick for Arciero Racing. Lazier started and finished in 26th, retiring from the race early on due to a gearbox problem. Lazier achieved a best finish of 12th place at the Molson Indy Vancouver at Concord Pacific Place, scoring his only championship point of 1990 – a result which scored him 29th place in the final standings.

1991
For 1991, Lazier drove for various teams in various cars. Lazier first drove for Dale Coyne Racing in the No. 90 Lola T88/00-Cosworth DFX at the season-opening Gold Coast IndyCar Grand Prix at the Surfers Paradise Street Circuit. Lazier started 24th, but his race lasted just over a lap due to suspension failure. Lazier moved to Todd Walther Racing and the No. 44 Lola Cars T89/00-Cosworth DFS at the Toyota Grand Prix of Long Beach. Lazier started in 26th place, but retired after 8 laps due to an engine failure. Lazier returned to Hemelgarn Racing at the Indianapolis 500 in the No. 71 Lola T90/00-Buick. Lazier qualified for the race for the first time, starting 23rd. On the first lap of the race, Gary Bettenhausen got sideways in turn 1 and Lazier hit the outside wall in avoidance; he continued to the pit lane where he retired due to accident damage. Lazier was credited with a 33rd-place finish.

Lazier was entered in the No. 19 Lola T90/00-Cosworth DFS for Dale Coyne Racing at the Miller Genuine Draft 200 at the Milwaukee Mile, but Dale Coyne replaced Lazier prior to qualifying. At the following race, the Valvoline Grand Prix of Detroit, Lazier returned to Coyne's No. 90 car, now utilizing a Lola T90/00-Cosworth DFS. Lazier started in 20th place and finished in 18th place, five laps down. Lazier returned to the No. 19 car for the Budweiser Grand Prix of Cleveland at Cleveland Burke Lakefront Airport. Lazier started in 20th place but recorded his first points-scoring finish of the season with an eleventh-place finish, albeit four laps down. After the event, two of the teams that Lazier had driven for in the 1991 season – Hemelgarn Racing and Dale Coyne Racing – formed an alliance, resulting in the team being called Hemelgarn Coyne Racing. Lazier drove for the team at the Molson Indy Toronto at Exhibition Place. Lazier started in 20th place, but retired after 17 laps due to an engine failure.

Lazier drove the same car at the Texaco/Havoline Grand Prix of Denver, where he recorded his best results of the 1991 season. Lazier started in 16th place and finished in 9th place, two laps down. Lazier moved to Walker Racing, driving the No. 10 Lola T90/00-Cosworth DFS at the Pioneer Electronics 200 at Mid-Ohio Sports Car Course. Lazier started in 17th place but did not complete a single lap due to an electrical issue. Lazier returned to Coyne's No. 90 car at the Texaco/Havoline 200 at Road America. Lazier started in 19th place but again did not complete a single lap due to an electrical issue. Lazier then competed in the season-ending Toyota Monterey Grand Prix at Laguna Seca for Hemelgarn Coyne Racing in No. 39 Lola T90/00-Cosworth DFS. Lazier started in 21st place but retired after 41 laps due to an engine failure. Lazier finished in 22nd place in the final championship standings with 6 points.

1992
In 1992, Lazier began to drive for Leader Card Racing and at first, drove the No. 21 Lola T90/00-Buick. At the season-opening Daikyo IndyCar Grand Prix at Surfers Paradise, Lazier started in 20th place and finished in 16th place, eighteen laps down. At the Valvoline 200 at Phoenix International Raceway, Lazier started in 17th place and finished in 14th place, thirty-three laps down. Lazier scored his first point of the season at the Toyota Grand Prix of Long Beach, scoring a 12th-place finish despite running out of fuel after completing 80 of the race's 105 laps. At the Indianapolis 500, Lazier began to drive an unsponsored Lola T91/00-Buick. Lazier crashed during practice for the race, but he was able to make the field, in 24th place. Lazier retired due to an engine failure after completing 139 laps, and was scored in 14th place. At the following two races, the ITT Automotive Grand Prix of Detroit and the Budweiser G.I. Joe's 200 at Portland International Raceway, Lazier was scored in 24th place on both occasions, retiring due to a broken half shaft at Detroit and a clutch problem at Portland.

The team regained sponsorship from Seaway Food Town and Project Pacific, when they used the T90/00 at the Miller Genuine Draft 200 at the Milwaukee Mile where Lazier started and finished in 17th place, twenty-four laps down. The team added sponsorship from Viper Auto Security for the rest of the season starting with the Molson Indy Toronto at Exhibition Place, where Lazier started in 20th place and finished in 15th place, twelve laps down. Lazier recorded his best finish of the season at the following race, the Marlboro 500 at Michigan International Speedway, with a 7th-place finish, fourteen laps down. Starting at the Budweiser Grand Prix of Cleveland at Cleveland Burke Lakefront Airport, the team used an Ilmor-Chevrolet engine; Lazier started and finished in 23rd place due to an engine failure after 25 laps. The team reverted to Buick for the Bosch Spark Plug Grand Prix at Pennsylvania International Raceway. Lazier started in 19th place and finished in 15th place, fifteen laps down. Lazier finished a career-best 19th in the championship with 10 points.

1993
For 1993, Lazier returned with Leader Card Racing to drive the No. 20 Lola T91/00-Ilmor. At the season-opening Australian FAI IndyCar Grand Prix at Surfers Paradise, Lazier started in 25th place but retired after 35 laps due to a suspension failure. At Phoenix, Lazier started in 18th place and finished in 17th place due to a header problem after 141 laps. Lazier finished his first race of the season at Long Beach; he started in 24th place and finished in 19th place, fifteen laps down. At the Indianapolis 500, the team once again acquired sponsorship from Viper Auto Security, and restored a Buick engine to the chassis. During qualifying Lazier's car blew an engine and was unable to qualify for the race. At Milwaukee, Seaway Food Town and Project Pacific returned as the sponsors for the team. Lazier started in 20th place and finished in 15th place, thirteen laps down.

At the ITT Automotive Grand Prix of Detroit, Lazier started in 26th place but crashed out of the race after completing 55 laps. The team then used a Lola T92/00-Ilmor at Cleveland and Michigan. At Cleveland, the car had additional sponsorship from Viper Auto Security and Applebee's; Lazier started in 23rd place but suffered an electrical issue after completing 61 laps. At Michigan, the car was unsponsored and Lazier started in 18th place. Oil pressure problems occurred during the race, forcing Lazier's retirement after completing 43 laps. The team restored the Buick engine for the New England 200 at New Hampshire International Speedway, where Lazier failed to qualify. Lazier scored his best finish of the season at the Texaco/Havoline 200 at Road America with a 14th-place finish. The team acquired sponsorship from Financial World starting at the Pioneer Electronics 200 at Mid-Ohio Sports Car Course; Lazier finished in 20th place in the race, and ultimately finished 35th in the championship.

1994
In 1994, Lazier returned with Leader Card Racing to drive the No. 23 Lola T93/00-Ilmor. At the season-opening Australian FAI Indycar Grand Prix at Surfers Paradise, Lazier was too slow to qualify. Lazier made his season debut at the next race, the Slick 50 200 at Phoenix. Lazier started in 25th place and finished in a season-best 13th-place finish, ten laps down. At Long Beach, Lazier started in 30th place but retired due to an exhaust problem after completing 6 laps. At the Indianapolis 500, Lazier practiced in his usual Leader Card Racing car, as well as both the No. 94 Hemelgarn Racing Lola T92/00-Buick and the No. 5 Lola T94/00-Ford Cosworth XB for Dick Simon Racing. Lazier did not complete a qualifying attempt in any of the three cars and failed to qualify for the race.

At the following race, the Miller Genuine Draft 200 at the Milwaukee Mile, Lazier started in 24th place and finished in 18th place, twelve laps down. Lazier started in 27th place at the following race, the ITT Automotive Grand Prix of Detroit, and finished in 17th place, two laps down. Lazier started in 29th place and finished in 24th place in the Budweiser/G. I. Joe's 200 at Portland International Raceway, after running out of fuel after completing 91 laps. Following Portland, Lazier started only two more races during the season. At the Budweiser Grand Prix of Cleveland at Cleveland Burke Lakefront Airport, Lazier was replaced by pay driver Giovanni Lavaggi. Lazier qualified but did not start either the Molson Indy Toronto at Exhibition Place and the Slick 50 200 at New Hampshire, and he failed to qualify at Mid-Ohio and Nazareth. Lazier did however compete in the Marlboro 500 at Michigan International Speedway and the Molson Indy Vancouver at Concord Pacific Place. Lazier started in 21st place at Michigan, but failed to finish due to an electrical issue, while a half shaft problem caused him to retire at Vancouver. Lazier finished in 36th place in the final championship standings.

1995
Lazier did not return with Leader Card for 1995, instead driving for various other teams. Lazier first drove for Project Indy in the No. 64 Reynard 94i-Ford Cosworth XB at the second race of the season, the Gold Coast Indy at Surfers Paradise. Lazier started in 24th place and finished in 21st place, retiring with broken transmission after completing 32 laps. Lazier then drove for Payton/Coyne Racing in the No. 19 Lola T94/00-Ford Cosworth XB at Nazareth. Lazier started in 20th place but crashed out of the race with Paul Tracy after completing 38 laps. At the Indianapolis 500, Lazier drove for Team Menard originally in the No. 51 Lola T93/00-Menard. Lazier then practiced the team's No. 40 Lola T95/00-Menard entry that Arie Luyendyk qualified. Lazier qualified on the second day of qualifying in the No. 80 Lola T95/00-Menard, doing so in 23rd place. Lazier retired from the race after 45 laps due to fuel system problems.

Lazier returned to Payton/Coyne Racing's No. 19 car, now utilizing a Lola T95/00 chassis, at Milwaukee. Lazier started in 24th place and finished in 18th place, twelve laps down. Lazier returned to Project Indy's No. 64 entry at Toronto. Lazier started in 27th place and finished in 15th place, five laps down. Lazier returned to Payton/Coyne Racing's No. 19 car, which had reverted to the T94/00 chassis, for Michigan. Lazier started in 20th place and finished in a season-best 14th place, twenty-seven laps down. The final race of the season that Lazier competed in was the New England 200 at New Hampshire. Lazier finished in 35th place in the final championship standings.

Indy Racing League

1996
Lazier moved to the Indy Racing League to compete in its inaugural season in 1996 for Hemelgarn Racing in the No. 91 Reynard 95i-Ford Cosworth XB. At the season-opening Indy 200 at Walt Disney World Speedway, Lazier recorded the series' inaugural pole position. In the race Lazier led for 28 laps, but retired due to brake failure after completing 61 laps. During practice for the following race, the Dura Lube 200 at Phoenix International Raceway, Lazier was involved in a crash with Lyn St. James. He suffered a fractured vertebra and was ruled out of the race.

Still in pain and walking with a cane, Lazier returned two months later for the season-ending race, the Indianapolis 500. His car was fitted with a special shock-absorbing seat to reduce the risk of re-injuring his back. Prior to the race the team gained additional sponsorship from Montana Rail Link. Lazier initially qualified in 7th place but was promoted to 5th place after Arie Luyendyk's time was disallowed and pole sitter Scott Brayton was fatally injured during practice. Lazier was among the leaders all day, battling with Tony Stewart, Davy Jones, Roberto Guerrero and Luyendyk. Stewart retired after 82 laps due to an engine failure and Luyendyk was eliminated after a collision with Eliseo Salazar. Guerrero fell two laps down after having a fire in his pit stall. During caution periods Lazier would raise his hands out of the cockpit to stretch his fingers, prompting many fans, thinking he was waving, to wave back at him. Lazier's team brought him in for his final pit stop several laps later than the rest of the leaders, which put him behind on the track but able to turn up his turbo boost pressure and run faster to the finish. With 10 laps to go Lazier was running in 3rd place behind Jones and Alessandro Zampedri but easily passed both of them over the next two laps and led the rest of the way to win his first IndyCar race, leading a total of 43 laps. Lazier finished 14th in the championship with 159 points.

1996–97
For the 1996–97 season, Lazier returned with Hemelgarn Racing. During the 1996 portion of the season, Lazier drove the No. 91 Reynard 95i-Ford Cosworth XB. At the season-opening True Value 200 at New Hampshire International Speedway, Lazier started in 4th place and was running in 2nd place, the only car on the lead lap besides race leader Tony Stewart. On lap 67, race broadcaster ABC was broadcasting Lazier's conversation with his team when Stewart attempted to lap Lazier in turn 4. The two cars then made contact and Lazier spun and crashed into the wall. Unaware that he was on an open mic, Lazier first said, (in reference to Stewart) "The son of a bitch just ran into the back of me," and then said to his pit crew, "He must have just fucking hit me in the back." After being released from the infield care center, Lazier quickly apologized for his language during a pitlane interview. At the following race, the Las Vegas 500K at Las Vegas Motor Speedway, Lazier started in 4th place and retired after 35 laps due to handling issues.

For the 1997 portion of the season, Lazier drove the No. 91 Dallara IR7-Infiniti, with additional sponsorship from Xerox and Cinergy. At the Indy 200 at Walt Disney World, Lazier started in 11th place and finished in 5th place, his first top-five of the season. At the Phoenix 200 at Phoenix International Raceway, Lazier started in 13th place and finished in 21st place due to an engine failure after 31 laps. Prior to the Indianapolis 500, the Infiniti engine was replaced with an Oldsmobile engine. Lazier qualified in 10th place and was fastest on two practice days post-qualifying. In the race Lazier battled with Luyendyk, Scott Goodyear, Jeff Ward, Stewart and Robbie Buhl, leading for 7 laps and finished fourth behind Luyendyk, Goodyear and Ward. At the following race, the True Value 500 at Texas Motor Speedway, Lazier started in 4th place and led twice for a combined total of 57 laps. On lap 157, Lazier retired from the race due to an engine failure and was scored in 17th place. Lazier then finished in 8th place at the following race, the Samsonite 200 at Pikes Peak International Raceway. Lazier achieved his first win of the season at the VisionAire 500 at Charlotte Motor Speedway, after starting in 5th place and leading for 58 laps. At the Pennzoil 200 at New Hampshire, Lazier started in 15th place and finished in 12th place, five laps down. At the season-ending Las Vegas 500K, Lazier started in 14th place but retired due to a mechanical problem after 4 laps. Lazier finished in 8th place in the final point standings with 209 points, having been as high as 5th during the season.

1998
In 1998, Lazier returned with Hemelgarn Racing to drive the No. 91 Dallara IR8-Oldsmobile. At the season-opening Indy 200 at Walt Disney World, Lazier started in 8th place after qualifying was rained out. In the race, Lazier led for 34 laps, but crashed out while attempting to lap Stéphan Grégoire in turn 2. At the following race, the Dura Lube 200 at Phoenix, Lazier started in 9th place but retired due to an engine failure after 9 laps. At the Indianapolis 500, Lazier qualified in 11th place. In the race Lazier ran in the top five and battled with Billy Boat, Kenny Bräck, Luyendyk, Greg Ray, John Paul Jr. and Eddie Cheever for the lead. In the final 20 laps, Cheever and Lazier were the main contenders. Lazier closed to within 1.1 seconds of Cheever, and despite a late-race caution due to Marco Greco's car smoking, Cheever led Lazier home at the finish.

At the following race, the True Value 500 at Texas, Lazier started and finished in 11th place due to a wheel bearing problem after completing 194 laps. Lazier then finished in 7th place at the following race, the New England 200 at New Hampshire. Lazier then achieved his second 2nd-place finish of the season at the Pep Boys 400K at Dover Downs International Speedway after leading for 7 laps. At the following race, the VisionAire 500K at Lowe's Motor Speedway, Lazier started in 14th place and finished in 13th place, thirty-seven laps down. At the Radisson 200 at Pikes Peak, Lazier started in 17th place and finished in 7th place, one lap down. Lazier then started in 18th place at the Atlanta 500 Classic at Atlanta Motor Speedway, but retired due to an engine failure after completing 136 laps. At the following race, the Lone Star 500 at Texas, Lazier started in 19th place and finished in 6th place, two laps down, after leading for 14 laps. At the season-ending Las Vegas 500K at Las Vegas, Lazier started in 17th place and led for 60 laps en route to 3rd place. Lazier finish the season in a then-career best 5th place in the final championship standings with 262 points.

1999
In 1999, Lazier returned with Hemelgarn Racing to drive the No. 91 Dallara IR9-Oldsmobile. At the season-opening TransWorld Diversified Services Indy 200 at Walt Disney World Speedway, Lazier started in 8th place and finished in 10th place, two laps down. At the second race of the season, the MCI WorldCom 200 at Phoenix, Lazier started in 15th place and was involved in a crash with Eddie Cheever on lap 149 in turn 3. At Lowe's Motor Speedway, Lazier started in 14th place and was soon battling with Ray for the lead; Lazier led for 23 laps. On lap 59 Stan Wattles's car had a suspension failure, with Paul Jr. then hitting the debris from the car sending it into the seating area and three spectators were killed. The race immediately went under caution with Lazier as the leader. Lazier then made a pit stop to replace a punctured tire. After 18 laps of caution the race was abandoned, with no points awarded. At the Indianapolis 500, the team gained additional sponsorship from Tae Bo and Lazier qualified in 22nd place. Lazier was not a factor in the race and finished in 7th place, two laps down.

At the following race, the Longhorn 500 at Texas, Lazier started in 24th place and finished in 14th place, eight laps down. At Pikes Peak, Lazier started in 12th place and finished in 5th place. At the Kobalt Mechanics Tools 500 at Atlanta, Lazier started in 15th place and finished in 21st place due to a crash on lap 114 with Sam Schmidt while battling for the lead. Lazier then scored his best finish of the season with a 2nd-place finish at the MBNA Mid-Atlantic 200 at Dover Downs, having started in 17th place. Lazier followed this up with a 4th-place finish at the Colorado Indy 200 at Pikes Peak after starting in 9th place. Lazier then finished in 11th place, nine laps down, at the Vegas.com 500 at Las Vegas, after starting in 10th place. Lazier then finished in 10th place, four laps down, at the season-ending Mall.com 500 at Texas after starting in 16th place. Lazier finished the season in 6th place in the final championship standings with 224 points, having been as high as fourth in points.

2000
In 2000, Lazier first drove the No. 91 Riley & Scott Mk VII-Oldsmobile for Hemelgarn Racing. At the season-opening Delphi Indy 200 at Walt Disney World, Lazier started in 5th place and led for 47 laps and finished in 2nd place. At the second race of the season, the MCI WorldCom Indy 200 at Phoenix, Lazier started in 26th place, having missed qualifying. Lazier first took the lead on lap 151 and led through lap 155 when Robbie Buhl took the lead. Lazier then retook the lead on lap 161 and led the remaining 40 laps to win his first race since the 1997 VisionAire 500. Lazier became the first driver to win an IRL race after starting in last place, and became the third driver to win an Indy car race from last place at Phoenix after Mike Mosley in 1974 and Roberto Guerrero in 1987. Following the race, Lazier led the point standings for the first time in his career.

At the Vegas Indy 300 at Las Vegas, Lazier started in 22nd place and finished in 20th place due to a fuel pump issue after completing 65 laps. At the Indianapolis 500 the Riley & Scott was replaced by the Dallara IR00 for the remainder of the season. Lazier qualified in 16th place, but quickly moved into the top 5. In the second half of the race, Lazier became one of the few drivers to challenge race leader Juan Pablo Montoya. Lazier was unable to catch Montoya, who won by 7.1839 seconds. At the following race, the Casino Magic 500 at Texas, Lazier qualified on pole position and led for 62 laps, but ultimately finished in 7th place. At Pikes Peak, Lazier started in 13th place and retired on the 2nd lap of the race due to an engine failure.

At the Midas 500 Classic at Atlanta, Lazier started in 11th place and led for 2 laps before finishing in 2nd place. Following the race Lazier retook the points lead, ahead of the inaugural Belterra Resort Indy 300 at Kentucky Speedway. Lazier started in 7th place and led for 40 laps to win his second race of the season, also setting the race's fastest lap. Going into the season-ending Excite 500 at Texas, Lazier led Goodyear by 38 points and Cheever by 41 points, with a maximum of 53 points available. Goodyear won the race ahead of Cheever, while fourth place was good enough for the championship. Lazier won the championship with 290 points, 18 ahead of Goodyear and 33 ahead of Cheever. Lazier is the last driver to be born in the 1960s to win an IndyCar championship.

2001
For 2001, Lazier drove the No. 91 Dallara IR01-Oldsmobile for Hemelgarn Racing. At the season-opening Pennzoil Copper World Indy 200 at Phoenix, Lazier started in 6th place and finished in 3rd place. At the Infiniti Grand Prix of Miami at Homestead-Miami Speedway, Lazier started in 3rd place and finished in 20th place, after crashing on lap 177 in turn 4. At the following race, the zMax 500 at Atlanta, Lazier started in 9th place and finished in 6th place, one lap down. At the Indianapolis 500, Lazier gained additional sponsorship from Life Fitness for the race and qualified in 10th place. In the race, Lazier came into the pits after 9 laps saying that his engine was running on only seven cylinders. Lazier would eventually rejoin the race and finished in 18th place, eight laps down.

At the first Texas race, Lazier started in 13th place and finished in 4th place. At Pikes Peak, Lazier started in 5th place and took the lead on lap 157 after Sam Hornish Jr., who had led for 152 of the previous 156 laps, suffered handling issues. Lazier led the remaining 43 laps of the race for his first win of the season. Lazier then won the SunTrust Indy Challenge at Richmond International Raceway after starting in 4th place, leading 224 of 250 laps. Following the race, Lazier moved into 2nd place in the point standings, 50 points behind Hornish. At the Ameristar Casino Indy 200 at Kansas Speedway, Lazier started in 12th place and finished in 5th place after leading for 13 laps. At the next race, the Harrah's 200 at Nashville Superspeedway, Lazier started in 6th place and led for 71 laps en route to his third win of the season. With the win, Lazier took the record for the most wins in the IRL with six.

Lazier then won his fourth race of the season at Kentucky after starting in 11th place and led for 84 laps. Following the race Lazier was only 25 points behind Hornish. At the Gateway Indy 250 at Gateway International Raceway, Lazier started in 2nd place after qualifying was rained out. In the race Lazier finished in 13th place, ten laps down. At the following race, the Delphi Indy 300 at Chicagoland Speedway, Lazier started in 9th place and finished in 11th place, two laps down. Hornish finished in 2nd place to Jaques Lazier, to clinch the championship with a round to spare. At the season-ending Chevy 500 at Texas, Lazier started in 2nd place after qualifying was rained out again. Lazier led a lap, but ultimately retired from the race after suffering an engine failure. Despite winning a season-high four races, Lazier finished runner-up to Hornish in the final championship standings with 398 points.

2002
For 2002, Lazier returned with Hemelgarn Racing to drive the No. 91 Dallara IR02-Chevrolet. At the season-opening Grand Prix of Miami at Homestead, Lazier started in 16th place and finished in 22nd place due to an oil pressure problem after completing 111 laps. At the following race, the Bombardier ATV 200 at Phoenix, Lazier started in 9th place and finished in 7th place. At the Yamaha Indy 400 at California Speedway, Lazier started in 26th place and again finished in 7th place. At the next race, the Firestone Indy 225 at Nazareth, Lazier started in 6th place and was involved in a crash with Sam Hornish Jr. – who continued several laps down – on lap 38 in turn 3 and was scored in 23rd place. At the Indianapolis 500, Lazier qualified in 20th place. In the race, Lazier began to move into the top 10 and with 12 laps remaining Lazier was running in 6th place, on the lead lap. On lap 199 in turn 2 the lapped car of Laurent Rédon lost control and collected Lazier. At the same time Paul Tracy was attempting to pass Hélio Castroneves for the lead in turn 3. Tracy passed Castroneves just after the crash and was the first car to cross the finish line. Indy Racing League officials declared that the pass occurred after the crash and Castroneves was the winner. Tracy's team, Team Green, protested by saying that the caution light was not displayed until after the pass occurred. The original results stood with Lazier finishing in 15th place.

At the following race, the Boomtown 500 at Texas, Lazier started in 10th place and finished in 8th place. At the Radisson Indy 225 at Pikes Peak, Lazier started in 10th place and finished in 15th place, three laps down. Lazier then finished in 18th place at Richmond due to a fire breaking out on his car after completing 91 laps having started in 5th place. At Kansas, Lazier started in 5th place and finishing in 7th place. At the Firestone Indy 200 at Nashville, Lazier started and finished in 12th place due to a crash on lap 182 in turn 2. At the next race, the Michigan Indy 400 at Michigan, Lazier started in 15th place and finished in 13th place, two laps down. Lazier then finished in 3rd place at the Belterra Casino Indy 300 at Kentucky after starting in 3rd place and leading for 3 laps, the only laps that Lazier led during the season. At Gateway, Lazier started in 18th place and finished in 15th place, nine laps down. At Chicagoland, Lazier started in 22nd place and finished in 3rd place. At the season-ending Chevy 500 at Texas, Lazier started in 20th place and finished in 7th place. Lazier finished in 8th place in the final championship standings with 305 points.

2003
In 2003, Lazier returned with Hemelgarn Racing to drive the No. 91 Dallara IR03-Chevrolet. At the season-opening Toyota Indy 300 at Homestead, Lazier withdrew from the race and missed his first IRL race since the 1996 Dura Lube 200. At the following race, the Purex Dial Indy 200 at Phoenix, Lazier started in 15th place and finished in 11th place, two laps down. Lazier then started in 17th place and finished in 19th place at the Indy Japan 300 at Twin Ring Motegi due to an engine failure after completing 63 laps. At the Indianapolis 500 Lazier qualified in 21st place. Prior to the race the team gained additional sponsorship from Victory Brands. Lazier retired from the race after 171 laps due to an engine failure. At the Bombardier 500 at Texas, Lazier started in 19th place and finished in 13th place, four laps down. Lazier then got his only top 10 finish of the season with a 10th-place finish at the Honda Indy 225 at Pikes Peak. At Richmond, Lazier started and finished in 20th place, six laps down.

At the following race, the Kansas Indy 300, Lazier started in 21st place and finished in 13th place, eight laps down. Lazier was running in the top 10 in the late stages at Nashville, when he spun on the main straightaway on lap 194. Lazier woas able to drive back to his pit stall to change the tires on his car, but on lap 199 Lazier crashed in turn 2 and was credited with a 14th-place finish. Lazier then started in 21st at the Firestone Indy 400 at Michigan before finishing in 12th place, four laps down. Lazier then finished 11th place at the Emerson Indy 250 at Gateway. The team then gained sponsorship from Metabolife starting at Kentucky, where Lazier started in 20th place and finished in 16th place, four laps down. Following Chicagoland, where Lazier finished one lap down in 16th place, Lazier was replaced by Richie Hearn for the final two races of the season, the Toyota Indy 400 at Fontana and the Chevy 500 at Texas. Lazier finished in 19th place in the final championship standings with 201 points.

2004
In 2004, Hemelgarn Racing was unable to acquire sponsorship for the entire season, leaving Lazier without a car to drive for the season. Lazier only competed in the Indianapolis 500. Lazier first practiced in the No. 24 Dallara IR03-Chevrolet for Dreyer & Reinbold Racing on May 21, two days before Bump Day. Felipe Giaffone had already qualified the team's primary car and Lazier was practicing for the team in both Giaffone's qualified car and also the team's back-up car in preparation for potentially attempting to qualify for the race. Hemelgarn Racing became the entrant of the car while Dreyer & Reinbold partnered with the team. The back-up car became the No. 91 Dallara IR03-Chevrolet and Lazier started in 28th place. In the race Lazier moved through the field into the top 15 positions and was running in 12th place when he retired after 164 laps due to a fuel system failure. Lazier finished in 30th place in the final championship standings with 12 points.

2005
In 2005, Lazier again did not have a full-time team to drive for. Lazier drove for Panther Racing at the Indianapolis 500 in the No. 95 Dallara IR03-Chevrolet. Lazier qualified for the race in 9th place, beating Panther Racing's two full-time drivers Tomáš Enge and Tomas Scheckter. On the final day of practice before the race, Carb Day, Lazier crashed in turn 4 and slid along the outside wall on the main straightaway. Lazier was not injured in the crash and the car was repaired by race day. Prior to the race the team acquired Jiffy Lube as an additional primary sponsor on the car. Lazier ran in the top 10 for most of the race, despite Scott Sharp making contact with Lazier's car earlier in the race, damaging the front wing. Lazier continued in the race and passed Sébastien Bourdais for 5th place, just before Bourdais crashed out of the race.

With Lazier's Indianapolis performance, Panther Racing fielded an additional car for Lazier in four races. Lazier drove the same car he drove at Indianapolis, with sponsorship from Pennzoil, Jonathan Byrd's Cafeteria and the American Sentry Guard. At Nashville, Lazier started in 3rd place and finished in 9th place. Lazier then competed in the following race, the ABC Supply Company A. J. Foyt 225 at the Milwaukee Mile, after teammate Enge was injured at Nashville. Lazier drove the No. 2 Dallara IR05-Chevrolet. In the race, Lazier started in 5th place and was scored in 18th place after crashing out after 129 laps. Lazier returned to the No. 95 at Michigan, where he started and finished in 6th place. Lazier then started in 8th place and finished in 6th place at the following race, the AMBER Alert Portal Indy 300 at Kentucky. The final race that Lazier contested in the 2005 season was the Peak Antifreeze Indy 300 at Chicagoland. In the race, Lazier started in 7th place and finished in 10th place. Lazier finished in 23rd place in the final championship standings with 140 points. Following the season, Panther downsized to one car for the 2006 season due to their engine supplier, Chevrolet, and their sponsor, Pennzoil, leaving the series at the end of the 2005 season.

2006

In 2006, Lazier returned to Dreyer & Reinbold Racing after practicing for the team at the 2004 Indianapolis 500. Lazier drove the No. 5 Dallara IR03-Honda. Lazier attempted to compete in his first full-time season since 2002. At the season-opening Toyota Indy 300 at Homestead, Lazier started in 14th place. The race weekend was overshadowed by the death of Paul Dana in final practice; Lazier retired after 12 laps due to an electrical problem, and was scored in 14th. Lazier competed in his first non-oval race at the Honda Grand Prix of St. Petersburg. Lazier started in 18th place and was scored in 14th place due to a brake problem after completing 59 laps. At Motegi, Lazier started in 15th place and finished in 14th place, five laps down. At the Indianapolis 500, Lazier qualified in 25th place. Lazier was running in the top 10 in the second half of the race, but had to make a late-race pit stop to have enough fuel to finish the race and he finished in 12th place, one lap down; his best result of the season.

Lazier was then replaced by Ryan Briscoe for the following race, the Watkins Glen Indy Grand Prix at the Watkins Glen International road course. Lazier returned to the team at the following race, the Bombardier Learjet 500 at Texas. Lazier started in 15th place but retired due to a fuel pump failure after 56 laps. Lazier started in 19th place at Richmond and finished in 16th place, five laps down. Lazier scored his best start of the season at the Kansas Lottery Indy 300 at Kansas with a 7th place start. Lazier finished in 15th place, six laps down. Lazier was then replaced by Briscoe for the next two races before returning at Michigan. Lazier started and finished in 15th place, two laps down. For the remainder of the season Briscoe and Sarah Fisher drove the car, which resulted in Lazier finishing in 18th place in the final championship standings with 122 points.

2007–11
For 2007, Lazier had no team to drive for the entire season. Lazier drove for Sam Schmidt Motorsports, a team owned by Lazier's former competitor Sam Schmidt, at the Indianapolis 500. Lazier drove the No. 99 Dallara IR05-Honda. Lazier qualified for the race on the second day of qualifying in 22nd place. Lazier had been bumped from the field earlier in the day by Buddy Rice and later bumped Jon Herb from the field. Towards the end of the qualifying day, Lazier's brother Jaques Lazier attempted to qualify for the race, but his speed was too slow and he was waved off. In the race, Lazier ran in the middle of the field and was never in contention for a top 10 finish. Lazier finished in 19th place, two laps down, in the rain-shortened race. Indianapolis was the only race that Lazier competed in during the season and he finished in 28th place in the final championship standings with 12 points.

In 2008, Lazier returned to Hemelgarn-Johnson Racing for the Indianapolis 500 only, in the No. 91 Dallara IR05-Honda. On Bump Day, A. J. Foyt IV bumped Marty Roth from the field, but Roth would requalify and bumped Lazier from the field. In the final half-hour of the day, Lazier attempted to requalify for the race, but his speed was too slow and his team waved off the attempt after three laps. Dan Wheldon, who had qualified in 2nd place, and his Chip Ganassi Racing team helped Lazier with set up information. After qualifying, the team received primary sponsorship from LifeLock after Max Papis failed to qualify for the race in a car sponsored by the company. On lap 169 in the race, Lazier and Milka Duno made contact in turn 3 and Duno spun into the warm-up lane. Lazier finished the race in 17th place, five laps down. Lazier finished the season in 37th place in the final championship standings with 13 points.

For 2009, Lazier returned with Hemelgarn-Johnson Racing to drive the No. 91 Dallara IR05-Honda. Lazier began practicing on May 14 in preparation for attempting to qualify on the second and final weekend of qualifying. Lazier made a second qualifying attempt on Bump Day. Lazier failed to reach  and his team waved off his attempt. Lazier's car was put into the qualifying line late in the day for another attempt, but qualifying ended while Ryan Hunter-Reay was on his qualifying attempt and Alex Tagliani was in line ahead of Lazier. Lazier failed to qualify for his first Indianapolis 500 since 1994.

In 2010, Lazier was without a car to drive for the season after Hemelgarn Racing closed in April. Lazier attempted to find a car to drive for at the Indianapolis 500, but ultimately was unable to do so. As a result, Lazier did not contest any part of the Indianapolis 500 for the first time since 1988. In 2011, Lazier was reported to be in line for a drive at the Indianapolis 500 for Dragon Racing. Dragon Racing opted to run Ho-Pin Tung and Scott Speed, with Speed later being replaced by Patrick Carpentier. For the second year in a row, Lazier did not attempt to qualify for the Indianapolis 500.

2013–15
Lazier returned to the IndyCar Series after a three-year absence in 2013 when on May 8, Lazier's father, Bob Lazier, formed a team called Lazier Partners Racing with Corbet Krause, Chris Nielsen and Jason Peters. The team purchased a Dallara DW12 chassis from Fan Force United for $250,000. The chassis needed to be modified to have a Chevrolet engine placed into it. Lazier originally drove the car with no sponsorship and the paint scheme remained the same as when Fan Force United fielded the car, albeit with orange replacing the original gold stripes. Lazier first practiced on May 16, completing only installation laps. Lazier officially drove the car as the No. 91 entry, with Spirit of Oklahoma added to the car after the tornados in Moore, Oklahoma on May 20 as a sign of respect for the victims. Lazier retired from the race after completing 44 laps due to mechanical problems. Lazier only competed at Indianapolis and was ranked in 38th place in the final championship standings with 8 points.

For 2014, Lazier returned with Lazier Partners Racing to drive the No. 91 Dallara-Chevrolet at the Indianapolis 500. Lazier did not practice until May 15. On the first lap of the race, Lazier narrowly avoided Ryan Briscoe, who had nearly spun coming off turn 2. Lazier completed 87 laps before retiring due to clutch problems, and was scored in 32nd place. By starting the race, Lazier joined Tom Sneva and Roger McCluskey in a tie for 10th place for the most Indianapolis 500 starts with 18. Lazier also moved into 7th place for the most laps completed, with 2,797. Lazier only competed at Indianapolis and ultimately finished in 35th place in the final standings with 11 points.

In 2015, Lazier returned with Lazier Partners Racing to drive the No. 91 Dallara-Chevrolet at the Indianapolis 500. Lazier used using Chevrolet's new aero kit on the car. Lazier first practiced on May 14, completing 28 laps prior to Pole Day. The car then suffered gearbox issues prior to qualifying and Lazier was unable to make an attempt to qualify in the original line, but was repaired in time for the Last Row Shootout. Lazier's pit crew made wing adjustments to reduce the car's downforce.

Grand-Am Rolex Sports Car Series
In 2001, Lazier competed in the Grand-Am Rolex Sports Car Series. Lazier drove the No. 74 Riley & Scott Mk III-Judd with Jack Baldwin, George Robinson and Irv Hoerr for Robinson Racing in the Sport Racing Prototype (SR) class. Lazier only competed with the team at the season-opening Rolex 24 at Daytona. The car started in 2nd place overall and led 10 laps during the race. The car then suffered an engine failure after completing 563 laps; the car was classified in 5th place in its class and 22nd place overall. Lazier finished in 35th place in the final championship standings with 29 points.

International Race of Champions
In 2001, Lazier competed in the International Race of Champions as a representative of the Indy Racing Northern Light Series, with Eddie Cheever, Mark Dismore and Scott Goodyear – latterly replaced by Al Unser Jr. for the final two races of the season due to injuries received at the Indianapolis 500 – also representing the series. Lazier, as with the other drivers, drove a Pontiac Firebird Trans Am. At the season-opening race at Daytona International Speedway, Lazier started in 8th place and finished in 11th place due to a crash on lap 27 with Jeff Burton. At the following race at Talladega Superspeedway, Lazier started and finished in 3rd place. At the third race of the season at Michigan International Speedway, Lazier started in 7th place and finished in 6th place. At the final race of the season at the Indianapolis Motor Speedway, Lazier started in 4th place and finished in 11th place due to another crash with Burton, who had led every lap in the race up to that point. Lazier finished in 9th place in the final championship standings with 31 points, earning $40,000 for his efforts.

Lazier returned to the series in 2002, with Sam Hornish Jr., Scott Sharp and Unser Jr. joining him from the IRL. At the season-opening race at Daytona, Lazier started in 7th place and finished in 10th place. At the second race of the season, at California Speedway, Lazier started in 3rd place and finished in 9th place. At the following race at Chicagoland Speedway, Lazier qualified on pole position, and led flag-to-flag. At the final race of the season at Indianapolis, Lazier started in 8th place and finished in 4th place. As a result, Lazier finished in 2nd place in the final standings with 49 points, 5 points behind champion Kevin Harvick.

NASCAR Craftsman Truck Series
Later in his career, Lazier participated in NASCAR for a brief time. In 2005, Lazier tested a Chevrolet Silverado for Billy Ballew Motorsports at Lowe's Motor Speedway. In 2007, Lazier returned to drive for Billy Ballew Motorsports in the No. 15 Chevrolet Silverado at the Smith's Las Vegas 350 at Las Vegas Motor Speedway. Lazier said of the opportunity, "The opportunity arose for us to race in Las Vegas and I am extremely excited. They are racers on that team and to me it's a perfect fit, and I feel right at home with the whole team." Lazier started in 21st place and finished in 24th place, three laps down.

Media appearances

Television
After winning the Indianapolis 500, Lazier made a guest appearance on Late Night with Conan O'Brien. The episode that Lazier appeared on aired on May 29, 1996.

Lazier was nominated for the Best Driver ESPY Award in 2001 against Bobby Labonte, John Force and Gil de Ferran.

Personal life
Lazier was born in and currently resides in Vail, Colorado. Lazier is married to Kara, and the couple have two children: a son, Flinn, and a daughter, Jacqueline.

Lazier's father Bob Lazier was a former racing driver who won the CART Rookie of the Year Award in 1981. Lazier's brother Jaques Lazier competed in the Indy Racing League from 1998 to 2010, winning the 2001 Delphi Indy 200 at Chicagoland Speedway. With both drivers having won races, they are the only brothers to have both won races in the series.

Lazier and his relatives operate the Tivoli Lodge in Vail, Colorado, which his father opened in 1968.

Motorsports career results

American open–wheel racing results
(key) (Races in bold indicate pole position)

CART

IndyCar Series

* Season still in progress.
 1 Run on same day.
 2 Non-points-paying, exhibition race.

Indianapolis 500

NASCAR
(key) (Bold – Pole position awarded by qualifying time. Italics – Pole position earned by points standings or practice time. * – Most laps led.)

Craftsman Truck Series

International Race of Champions
(key) (Bold – Pole position. * – Most laps led.)

References

External links

Buddy Lazier Photos

1967 births
Living people
IndyCar Series champions
IndyCar Series drivers
Indianapolis 500 drivers
Indianapolis 500 winners
Champ Car drivers
International Race of Champions drivers
Curry College alumni
People from Vail, Colorado
Racing drivers from Colorado
NASCAR drivers
Arrow McLaren SP drivers
Dale Coyne Racing drivers
Dreyer & Reinbold Racing drivers
Panther Racing drivers